Michael Haydn's Symphony No. 40 in F major, Perger 32, Sherman 40, MH 507, written in Salzburg in 1789, was the last symphony in F major that he wrote.

The symphony is scored for 2 oboes, 2 bassoons, 2 horns, and strings, and in three movements:

Allegro molto
Adagio mà non troppo
Rondeau, Vivace

Discography

The London Mozart Players conducted by Matthias Bamert recorded this symphony on the Chandos label along with Symphonies No.s 11, 16, 25 and 34.

References
 A. Delarte, "A Quick Overview Of The Instrumental Music Of Michael Haydn" Bob's Poetry Magazine November 2006: 32 PDF
 Charles H. Sherman and T. Donley Thomas, Johann Michael Haydn (1737 - 1806), a chronological thematic catalogue of his works. Stuyvesant, New York: Pendragon Press (1993)
 C. Sherman, "Johann Michael Haydn" in The Symphony: Salzburg, Part 2 London: Garland Publishing (1982): lxviii

Symphony 40
1789 compositions
Compositions in F major